Julie Zwarthoed (born 25 September 1994) is a Dutch ice hockey winger and alternate captain for SDE Hockey of the Swedish Women's Hockey League (SDHL). She previously played with the Smoke Eaters Geleen of the Eerste Divisie.

Zwarthoed has represented the Netherlands at eight IIHF World Championships: in the Division III tournament in 2011; in the Division I Group B tournaments in 2012, 2013, 2014, 2015, 2016; and in the Division II Group A tournaments in 2017 and 2018. She has also competed for the Netherlands in the 2011–12 Elite Women's Hockey League and the qualification tournament for the 2014 Winter Olympics in Sochi.

She was a member of Team Netherlands at the 2012 Winter Youth Olympics held in Innsbruck, Austria, where she won a gold medal in the girls' individual skills challenge. The jersey she wore in the skills competition is on display at the Hockey Hall of Fame.

Awards

International
 World Championship Division 1B Silver Medal:  2013, 2015
World Championship Division 2A Silver Medal: 2017
World Championship Division 2A Top Player on Team:  2017
 World Championship Division 2A Gold Medal: 2018
World Championship Division 2A Top Scorer of the Tournament: 2018

SDHL
 SDE Stockholm top scorer: 2019–20

References

1994 births
Living people
Dutch women's ice hockey players
People from Schinnen
Dutch ice hockey forwards
Ice hockey players at the 2012 Winter Youth Olympics
Youth Olympic gold medalists for the Netherlands
SDE Hockey players
Sportspeople from Limburg (Netherlands)
European Women's Hockey League players
Dutch expatriate ice hockey people
Dutch expatriate sportspeople in Sweden
Expatriate ice hockey players in Sweden

External links